Terrence Stone is voice actor who is also known as Terry Stone. He is well known for voicing Zhao Yun in Dynasty Warriors series until the eight installment and Warriors Orochi series up to its sequel.

Filmography

Animated
 Cinderella and the Secret Prince – Eagle
 Gormiti: The Lords of Nature Return! – Wicked the Terrible, Additional Voices
 Santa's Apprentice – Elves, Jokey Santa, Crumpy Santa, Scottish Santa, Constable Stevens, Elf
 Spy Kids: Mission Critical – Agent No-One
 The Magic Snowflake – Elves, Jokey Santa, Grumpy Santa, Scottish Santa, Constable Stevens, Elf (US English version)
 The Nutcracker and the Mouse King – Additional Voices
 The Son of Bigfoot – Wallace Eastman

Anime
 Ah! My Goddess – Photographer
 Apocalypse Zero – Kagenari
 Arc the Lad (TV) – Chimera, Gequbec, Hunter B, Monster, soldier, Wounded Soldier
 Avenger – Par
 Bleach – Yoruichi Shihouin's Cat Form, Mayuri Kurotsuchi
 Blue Dragon – Salinas
 Bobobo-bo Bo-bobo – Czar Baldy Bald IV
 Brigadoon – Kushatohn, Neil, Polkun, Specialist
 Chobits – Yoshiyuki Kojima
 Cosmowarrior Zero – Ishikura
 Digimon Data Squad – Biyomon, Aquilamon
 Duel Masters – Kokujoh
 Eureka Seven – Morita
 Fake – Randy McLane
 Fighting Spirit – Kobashi's Opponent, Matsuda, Yajima Fan
 Gestalt – Gladiator B; Shazan
 Ghost in the Shell 2: Innocence – Forensics Chief, Pilot, Security 2, Shop Owner, Yakuza 3
 Great Teacher Onizuka – Floor Person, Masked Man, Young Man
 Grenadier – Leader
 Honeybee Hutch – Additional Voices
 Jungle de Ikou! – Various Characters
 Kyo Kara Maoh – Baker, Stoffel von Spitzweg
 Lupin III – Additional Voices
 Magic Knight Rayearth – Innova, Selece, Ferio (He is credited as Terry Roberts for Ferio, only)
 Naruto – Minister Shabadaba (Naruto Movie 3)
 Nightwalker – Student A; Truck Driver
 Nodame Cantabile – Maestro Franz von Stresemann
 Patlabor: The Movie – Various
 Patlabor 2: The Movie – Various
 Planetes – Materials Chief
 Reign: The Conqueror – Satibarzanes
 Rurouni Kenshin – Shinomori Aoshi
 Saiyuki Gunlock – Kougaji
 Saiyuki Reload – Kougaji
 Stellvia of the Universe – Clark Commander
 Tales from Earthsea – Additional Voices
 The Three Robbers – Coachman
 The Twelve Kingdoms – Koukin
 Vampire Princess Miyu – Additional Voices
 X – Kakyo Kuzuki
 YS-II – Astar

Live action
 A Summer Sonata – Alan
 Adventures in Voice Acting – Himself
 Bio-Zombie – Garage Mechanic, Iraqi, Motorcycle Cop, Zombies
 Chaplin (1992) – Reporter #11
 Frank Herbert's Children of Dune – Edric
 House of Lies – Eric
 Onmyoji – Abe No Seimei (voice)
 Perfect Target – Stiles
 Power Rangers: Time Force – Cinecon (voice)
 Project Shadowchaser II – Additional Voices
 Scooby-Doo 2: Monsters Unleashed – 10,000 Volt Ghost (voice)
 Serendipity – Additional Voices
 The Protector (1996) – Myles Vale
 VR Troopers – Magician, Amphibidor, Photobot (voice)
 Weather Girl – Guard, Announcer, PA

Video games 

 Ace Combat 6: Fires of Liberation (English version)
 Bleach: Dark Souls – Mayuri Kurotsuchi (English version)
 Bleach: Shattered Blade – Mayuri Kurotsuchi (English version)
 Bleach: The 3rd Phantom – Mayuri Kurotsuchi (English version)
 Bleach: The Blade of Fate – Mayuri Kurotsuchi (English version)
 Diablo III – Additional Voices
 Dragon's Dogma - Additional Voices (English version)
 Dynasty Tactics 2 – Zhao Yun (English version)
 Dynasty Warriors – Zhao Yun (Dynasty Warriors 4 - 8 Xtreme Legends) (English version)
 EverQuest II – Generic Male Dark Elf Merchant, Generic Male High Elf Guard, Generic Male Human Merchant
 Fist of the North Star: Ken's Rage - Juza (English version)
 Hearthstone – Innkeeper
 Kessen II – Zhao Yun (English version)
 MechWarrior 4 – Karl Sonntag
 Red Dead Redemption 2 – The Local Pedestrian Population
 Shadow Hearts: Covenant – Garan, Dr. Hojo
 Star Ocean: Second Evolution – Ernest Raviede
 Star Trek: 25th Anniversary Enhanced – Lt. Buchert, Andrea Preax, Brother Roberts
 Star Trek: Judgment Rites – Atrioli, Kapitan Hauptmann, Vardaine Assistant
 Stonekeep – Gorda Karn, Sarkan, Skrag
 Ultimate Spider-Man – Eddie Brock, Sr., Additional Voices
 Warriors Orochi – Zhao Yun (Warriors Orochi 1 & 2 English version)
 World of Warcraft: Mists of Pandaria – Scout Stonebeard

Staff work
 Alamo: The Price of Freedom – Stunts
 Best of the Best 3: No Turning Back – Casting Associate
 Dawn of the Dead – ADR Loop Group
 In Hell – Voice Casting Director
 Magic Knight Rayearth 2 – Writer
 Shark Attack – Voice Casting Director
 The Quest – Casting Assistant (2nd Unit)

References

External links
 

Living people
Casting directors
Male television writers
Year of birth missing (living people)
Place of birth missing (living people)